James Neil Nicolson (9 November 1971 – 28 February 1994) was an Australian boxer. He won a bronze medal at the 1989 World Amateur Boxing Championships in Moscow and a bronze medal at the 1990 Commonwealth Games in Auckland, before competing at the 1992 Summer Olympics in Barcelona. Nicolson turned professional later in 1992, and held a record of 7–1 prior to his death.

From Yatala, Queensland, Nicolson was born to a Scottish-born father, Allan, originally from Glasgow. His sister Skye, who was born the year after her brothers' deaths, was a bronze medallist at the 2016 World Amateur Championships and a gold medallist at the 2018 Commonwealth Games.

Death
On 28 February 1994, Nicolson was killed, along with his 10-year-old brother Gavin, in a traffic collision on the Pacific Highway in Helensvale, Gold Coast. The pair were headed to training in Nerang. Nicolson was 22.

Jamie Nicolson Avenue and Jamie Nicolson Park in Edens Landing are named in honour of him.

References

External links

1971 births
1994 deaths
Sportspeople from the Gold Coast, Queensland
Featherweight boxers
Olympic boxers of Australia
Boxers at the 1992 Summer Olympics
Boxers at the 1990 Commonwealth Games
Australian male boxers
Commonwealth Games medallists in boxing
Commonwealth Games bronze medallists for Australia
AIBA World Boxing Championships medalists
Road incident deaths in Queensland
Australian people of Scottish descent
Medallists at the 1990 Commonwealth Games